Danielithosia fuscipennis is a moth of the family Erebidae. It is found in China (Guangdong).

The forewings are light buff with a diffuse lightening along the costal margin at the basal 1/3. The hindwings are noticeably lighter than the forewing, with darker apical and external margins.

References

External links

Moths described in 2012
Endemic fauna of China
Lithosiina